Depending on design requirements, some ships have extremely large internal volumes in order to serve their duties. Gross tonnage is a monotonic and 1-to-1 function of the ship's internal structural volume. It does not include removable objects placed outside the deck or superstructure, like the shipping containers of a container ship.

Overall listing

See also
List of largest cruise ships

Notes

Largest Ships By Gross Tonnage
Largest Ships By Gross Tonnage
Largest things by volume